Eosphora is a genus of rotifers belonging to the family Notommatidae.

The species of this genus are found in Europe, Australia and Northern America.

Species:
 Eosphora anthadis Harring & Myers, 1922 
 Eosphora ehrenbergi Weber, 1918

References

Ploima
Rotifer genera